In enzymology, a globotriaosylceramide 3-beta-N-acetylgalactosaminyltransferase is an enzyme that catalyzes the chemical reaction

UDP-N-acetyl-D-galactosamine + alpha-D-galactosyl-(1->4)-beta-D-galactosyl-(1->4)-beta-D-glucosyl- (11)-ceramide  UDP + N-acetyl-beta-D-galactosaminyl-(1->3)-alpha-D-galactosyl-(1->4)- beta-D-galactosyl-(1->4)-beta-D-glucosyl-(11)-ceramide

The 3 substrates of this enzyme are UDP-N-acetyl-D-galactosamine, [[alpha-D-galactosyl-(1->4)-beta-D-galactosyl-(1->4)-beta-D-glucosyl-]], and (11)-ceramide, whereas its 3 products are UDP, [[N-acetyl-beta-D-galactosaminyl-(1->3)-alpha-D-galactosyl-(1->4)-]], and [[beta-D-galactosyl-(1->4)-beta-D-glucosyl-(11)-ceramide]].

Wrongly characterized previously as globotriosylceramide beta-1,6-N-acetylgalactosaminyl-transferase ( 

This enzyme belongs to the family of glycosyltransferases, specifically the hexosyltransferases.  The systematic name of this enzyme class is UDP-N-acetyl-D-galactosamine:alpha-D-galactosyl-(1->4)-beta-D-galact osyl-(1->4)-beta-D-glucosyl-(11)-ceramide III3-beta-N-acetyl-D-galactosaminyltransferase. This enzyme participates in glycosphingolipid biosynthesis - globoseries and glycan structures - biosynthesis 2.

References

 
 
 
 

EC 2.4.1
Enzymes of unknown structure